At the 2011 Pan Arab Games, the cycling events were held at Lusail Cycling Circuit in Doha, Qatar from 19–23 December. A total of 7 events were contested.

Medal summary

Men

Women

Medal table

References

External links
Cycling at official website

Pan Arab Games
Events at the 2011 Pan Arab Games
2011 Pan Arab Games
2011 in road cycling